Abdelhamid Temmar (born October 24, 1938) is an Algerian politician. He was former minister of Investment in the government of Abdelaziz Belkhadem. Since June 2008, he has been Minister of Industry and Investment Promotion under the government of Prime Minister Ahmed Ouyahia.

References
 Elwatan.com

 
Living people
1938 births
Place of birth missing (living people)
21st-century Algerian people
Industry ministers of Algeria
Trade ministers of Algeria